Chaowa Pawa is a 1959 Indian Bengali-language romantic comedy film directed by three directors Sachin Mukherjee, Dilip Mukherjee, Tarun Majumdar. It is based on the 1934 Academy Awards winning American film It Happened One Night. The film stars Uttam Kumar and  Suchitra Sen. This is the debut film of the legendary director Tarun Majumder and this film is regarded as one of the best film pairing Uttam-Suchitra. Film become huge success.

Plot 
Rajat is a young journalist who works for his fathers newspaper agency and is on the verge of being fired. He meets Manju, who has run away from home. He falls in love with Manju.

Cast 
 Uttam Kumar as Rajat Sen, a young, smart journalist working as an employee under Manju's father at the newspaper agency 'Janamat', who initially eyes for the bounty announced for Manju's return but later falls in love with her.
 Suchitra Sen as Manju, the single daughter of a rich, newspaper tycoon, who initially is short-tempered and spoiled kid later turns into a benevolent and sweet personality as she gradually develops a romantic interest in Rajat.
 Chhabi Biswas as Manju's father, a newspaper tycoon, and a dignified man full of authority and professionalism. He is a caring father, who is determined to marry his daughter to a person of his choice initially and later announces prize money over his daughter's safe return.
 Tulsi Chakraborty as Chakraborty "Chokkotty" Moshai, a clever innkeeper who plots a plan to grab the prize money.
 Jiben Bose as Banku/Banka, Rajat's friend, a jovial good-hearted person who invites Rajat and Manju to his home.
 Bharati Devi as Banku's wife, a friendly woman who acts as a catalyst in Rajat and Manju's relationship.
 Anil Chatterjee
 Amar Mullick 
 Rajlakshmi Devi as Chakraborty's wife.
 Shailen Mukherjee as guest house manager.

Crew 
 Director: Tarun Majumdar, Sachin Mukherjee, Dilip Mukherjee (as Yatrik
 Producer: Time Films
 Music director: Nachiketa Ghosh
 Cinematographer: Anil Gupta, Jyoti Laha
 Playback singer: Hemanta Mukherjee, Sandhya Mukhopadhyay

Soundtrack

Reception
This is the debut film of the legendary director Tarun Majumder. The film is one of the most iconic film of Uttam Suchitra pair. Generally the film become blockbuster hit at the box office and ran over 63 days in theaters.

References

External links 

 www.citwf.com

1959 films
Bengali-language Indian films
Films directed by Tarun Majumdar
1950s Bengali-language films
Indian remakes of American films